Domination is the fourth full-length studio album by death metal band Morbid Angel, released in 1995. This was Morbid Angel's last album under the label Giant Records before the label dropped the band. The band then re-signed with their former label, Earache Records. This is also the first Morbid Angel album to feature Hate Eternal frontman Erik Rutan on guitars and keyboards, who later left the band following this album, though he would return to the band for Gateways To Annihilation.

The CD cover is shown here. The LP artwork is a similarly styled image of statues in a desert. Initial copies came in a green jewelcase. There was also a limited edition "Slime Pack" planned, which was never released after several packs leaked before shipping and the slime-substance was found to be toxic.

A music video was produced for the song "Where the Slime Live".

David Vincent left the band in 1996 after the end of Domination tour cycle and was replaced by Steve Tucker. Vincent rejoined Morbid Angel in 2004 and appeared on their 2011 album Illud Divinum Insanus before leaving the band once again in 2015.

Track listing

Personnel
Morbid Angel
David Vincent – bass, vocals
Trey Azagthoth – guitars, keyboards
Erik Rutan – guitars, keyboards
Pete Sandoval – drums
Production
Morbid Angel – arrangement, production
Bill Kennedy – production, engineering, mixing
Mark Prator – assistant engineering
Eric Cadieux – programming, digital editing
Alan Yoshida – mastering

References

1995 albums
Earache Records albums
Morbid Angel albums